Mark Forward (born June 17, 1974) is a Canadian comedian and actor from Oakville, Ontario.

He is the winner of the 2005 Canadian Comedy Award for Best Stand-up Newcomer. He also won the Homegrown Competition at the 2006 Just for Laughs festival. He has performed at the Halifax Comedy Festival, Hub Cap Comedy Festival and Just for Laughs, opening for Craig Ferguson during his Hobo Fabulous tour.

He has appeared in Letterkenny, Fargo, Mr. D, The Rocker, Breakfast with Scot, The Sean Cullen Show, The Newsroom and Degrassi. Forward is also a writer and performer on The Jon Dore Television Show.

Filmography

Film

Television

Personal life
Forward lives in Toronto. He is married and has a son.

References

External links 
 
 
 Mark Forward Podcast

Canadian male comedians
Living people
Canadian male film actors
Canadian male television actors
Canadian male voice actors
Canadian television writers
Canadian stand-up comedians
Canadian male television writers
Canadian Comedy Award winners
1974 births